Ellen Valentik Leonida  is a partner at BraunHagey & Borden.  Her practice focuses on leading a broad range of impact litigation in state and federal courts. She also heads the firm's white collar practice.

Ellen has conducted over 80 jury trials in federal courts in the Northern District of California and California state courts. She served as the forensic staff attorney for the Northern District of California Federal Defender's Office, where she developed an annual DNA boot camp and offered training and guidance to criminal defense attorneys throughout the country on forensic issues. She has lectured nationally on topics including DNA, digital forensics, and trial skills.

Education
Leonida attended University of California, Santa Cruz, as an undergraduate majoring in American Studies. In 1993, she received a bachelor's degree  with College Honors and Highest Honors in the major and was admitted to Phi Beta Kappa.

She attended law school at UC Berkeley's Boalt Hall School of Law in Berkeley, California. In law school she was director of the Homeless Outreach Project and a founding member of the Boalt Hall Chapter of the National Association of Criminal Defense Lawyers as well as a volunteer at the California Asylum Representation Clinic.  Ms. Leonida received her JD in 1996.  On December 3, 1996, she was admitted to California State Bar.

Early career
In 1997, Leonida joined the Contra Costa County Public Defender's Office. Prior to joining the office she interned at the Lawyer's Committee for Civil Rights and the Youth Law Center. From 2010 to 2021 she was assistant Federal Public Defender in the Northern District of California, where she served as the forensic staff attorney. In that capacity, she successfully challenged the government's ability to obtain cell cite location data without a search warrant.

Scott Dyleski

Her most famous client from her state public defender days is Scott Dyleski.  In the fall of 2005, Dyleski, then 16, was accused of beating the wife, Pamela Vitale, of prominent criminal defense attorney Daniel Horowitz to death in their Lafayette, California home.  She became his attorney after the Dyleski family fired their attorney, Thomas McKenna due to a conflict of interest.  McKenna had defended the driver of a car that killed Dyleski's sister and another passenger in 2002. Dyleski was later convicted of the charges and sentenced to life in prison without the possibility of parole.

Notes

Living people
California lawyers
1970 births
People from Chișinău
Soviet emigrants to the United States
Criminal defense lawyers
American women lawyers
Public defenders
UC Berkeley School of Law alumni
University of California, Santa Cruz alumni
21st-century American women